Leptostales crossii, or Cross's wave moth, is a species of geometrid moth in the family Geometridae.

The MONA or Hodges number for Leptostales crossii is 7174.

References

Further reading

 
 

Sterrhinae
Articles created by Qbugbot
Moths described in 1900